Desmond Williams is a 20th century British architect who specialised in church architecture and was influenced by the Liturgical Movement. He was one of the most important architects of the Catholic Modernist movement in the United Kingdom.

Early and personal life
Williams has four children: Andy and Jez (who are members of the band Doves and twins) and Dominic and Sarah (who both became architects). Dominic is a director of his father's old firm Ellis Williams Architects, and Sarah ran the London office of AEDAS before starting her own practice Sarah Williams Architects in 2013.

Career
Williams is known for his striking modernist church buildings of the late 1950s and early 1960s. He initially worked with Arthur Facebrother, before setting up his own practice (Desmond Williams and Associates) in Manchester in the early 1960s, which in 1968 amalgamated with W and J B Ellis to become Ellis Williams Architects (still in practice today). Williams is regarded as one of the key British architects of the Roman Catholic Liturgical Movement in the UK that resulted in a large number of new modernist Catholic churches being built, and other churches being reordered. A group of architects that included Gillespie, Kidd & Coia, Gerard Goalen, Francis Pollen, Desmond Williams and Austin Winkley utilised contemporary design and construction methods to deliver the ‘noble simplicity’ instructed by Vatican I.

Mainstream Modern noted that Williams' Stella Maris Hostel (1966) was a "subtle but stylised building [that] has been much admired by enthusiasts of modern architecture and is often cited as one of the better, but lesser known examples of its time." It designed to resemble the bridge of a ship. But despite the admiration of modernist enthusiasts it was eventually demolished and replaced by housing.

A number of his buildings have now been listed including:
 St Augustine, Manchester 1966-1968  (Grade II)
 St Dunstan, Birmingham, 1966-1968 (Grade II)
 St Michael, Penn, Wolverhampton, 1967-1968 (Grade II)
 St Mary Dunstable (Grade II), which was built in 1964 at a cost of £72,000.

In the listing of St Mary's, Historic England notes that it is "as an important early work in the career of Desmond Williams, an architect notable for his innovative church buildings at a time of great change in ecclesiastical architecture." Williams said of the building: "It was circular, with the object being to bring as many of the congregation near the altar, and proved very popular in attracting worshippers. The ceiling was inspired by my earlier visits to kings College Chapel in Cambridge."

Other buildings

 St Mary, Blackburn (1959) - Designed by Desmond Williams & Associates whilst working for Arthur Farebrother and Partner
 Sacred Heart, Salford (1962) - Designs completed by Arthur Farebrother and Partner in 1960 but probably the first commission to be completed by Desmond William's own practice 
 Immaculate Conception, Bicester (1963)
 St Anthony, Slough (1964)
 St Joseph the Worker, Salford (1965)
 St Joseph, Ashton under Lyme (1965)
 Presbytery, Church of the Holy Trinity, Chipping Norton (1966) - remodelled and reordered, and the western bell tower taken down, by Desmond Williams Associates
 Stella Maris Hostel (1966) 
 Our Lady, Oldham (1967)
 St Patrick, Rochdale (1968)
 St Patrick, Coventry (1971)

Works

Awards and nominations
Williams' was given an OBE in 1988.

References

20th-century English architects
Living people
English ecclesiastical architects
Modernist architecture
Architects of the Liturgical Movement
Year of birth missing (living people)